The 2022 Billboard Music Awards were held on May 15, 2022, at the MGM Grand Garden Arena in Las Vegas. Hosted by Sean "Diddy" Combs, the show aired live on NBC and was also available for streaming on Peacock. Nominations across 62 categories—for releases during the period dated April 10, 2021 to March 26, 2022—were announced online through Twitter on April 8, 2022. The Weeknd received the most nominations of any artist, with 17; Doja Cat was the most-nominated female act with 14; BTS was the most-nominated group with seven.

Olivia Rodrigo won seven awards, including Top New Artist, and was the most-awarded artist at the show. Drake won five awards, including Top Artist, and extended his record as the most-awarded artist in BBMA history, with 34 wins overall.  BTS won three awards, including Top Duo/Group, and became the most-awarded group in BBMA history with 12 wins overall, breaking a 17-year record previously held by Destiny's Child. Justin Bieber became the first artist to win the Billboard Music Award for Top Hot 100 Song for a second time since the category's inception in 1990. Mary J. Blige was honored with the 10th Billboard Icon Award.

Background 
Nominations were announced on April 8, 2022, via Twitter, and selected from releases during the eligibility period of March 26, 2021, through April 10, 2022, which corresponded to Billboards chart dates of April 10, 2021, through March 26, 2022. Five new categories were included: Top Billboard  Global 200 Artist, Top Billboard Global Excl. U.S. Artist, Top Billboard Global 200 Song, Top Billboard Global Excl. U.S. Song, and Top Viral Song, taking the ceremony's total to 62 categories. The global categories are based on Billboards Global 200/Global Excl. U.S. charts launched in 2020 while the Viral Song category was created to honor songs that achieve virality on social media platforms, namely TikTok. No fan-voted categories were announced. Sean "Diddy" Combs was announced as the show's host (and executive producer alongside Robert Deaton) on April 22.

The awards were preceded by the first-ever Billboard MusicCon, a 2-day music event sponsored by Smirnoff and held on May 13 and 14 at Area15 in Las Vegas. Participants comprised both artists and executives, and included industry managers such as Dina Sahim (Swedish House Mafia, French Montana), Alex DePersia (Pharrell Williams, Gracie Abrams), and Nelly Ortiz (DJ Khaled). International artists invited as guest speakers included Anitta, Burna Boy, Ukrainian singer Max Barskih, and Rauw Alejandro. Anitta, Shenseea, Ty Dolla Sign, Latto, and Machine Gun Kelly were among the performers. Panels held included discussions on the evolution of the music scene across genres and cultures, and women in music, among other related topics.

Broadcast and viewership 
The show aired live on NBC and was also available for streaming on Peacock. It garnered the lowest viewership in the history of the ceremony, with 2.11 million viewers. The three-hour long broadcast earned an average 0.5 rating in the 18–49 demographic on NBC, dropping even lower than the previous year's 0.7 rating and 2.8 million audience.

Performers 
The first performance lineup was announced on April 19. It included four first-time performers: Rauw Alejandro, Megan Thee Stallion, Latto, and Burna Boy. Silk Sonic, Florence and the Machine, Maxwell—slated for a "special tribute performance to a pop icon"—and Morgan Wallen were announced on April 29. Ed Sheeran, Becky G, Miranda Lambert and Elle King, and Travis Scott were announced on May 9. The Red Hot Chili Peppers, who were included in the initial April 19 lineup, cancelled their performance on May 11, "due to unforeseen circumstances". Machine Gun Kelly and Dan + Shay were subsequently added.

Silk Sonic, Becky G, and Kelly made their BBMA performance debuts at the show. For Wallen, it was his first award show performance since being banned from attending and performing at various ceremonies in early 2021 after his racial slur controversy, while for Scott it was only his second live performance since the Astroworld Festival crowd crush in November 2021. Sheeran performed live from Belfast in Northern Ireland. Icon Award recipient Mary J. Blige, who was originally announced as a performer on April 14, did not perform at the show.

Presenters 
The initial list of presenters was released on May 13. Additional presenters were announced later that day and on the following, through the BBMAs official Twitter account.

 City Girls – presented Top R&B Artist
 Lainey Wilson – presented Top Rap Female Artist
 DJ Khaled and Heidi Klum – presented Top Rock Artist
 Fat Joe – introduced Florence and the Machine
 Michael Bublé and Anitta – presented Top Country Duo/Group
 AleXa — previewed "What's Coming Up"
 Diddy – presented the Revolt Black Excellence Award to Tamika Mallory and introduced Latto
 Liza Koshy – presented Top Dance/Electronic Album
 Shenseea – presented Pepsi Mic Drop
 Janet Jackson – presented the Icon Award
 Diddy and French Montana – introduced Travis Scott
 Pusha T – presented Top Country Male Artist
 Teyana Taylor — presented the Change Maker Award
 Diddy with graduates of Capital Prep — introduced Ed Sheeran
 Dove Cameron and Dixie D'Amelio – presented Top R&B Album
 Chloe Bailey – introduced Becky G
 Diddy – introduced Jozzy
 Giveon – introduced Burna Boy

Winners and nominees 
The Weeknd led the nominations for a second consecutive year, with 17 to his name. Doja Cat was the most-nominated female artist with 14. BTS earned the most nominations of any duo/group in BBMA history, with seven. Taylor Swift received a record-extending eighth nomination in the Top Artist category. Olivia Rodrigo, nominated alongside Swift in the aforementioned, also earned a nomination for Top New Artist, making her the third consecutive artist in BBMA history—Billie Eilish was the first, in 2020, followed by Pop Smoke in 2021—to be simultaneously nominated in both categories in the same year.

Winners for 54 non-televised awards were announced in a TikTok livestream on the red carpet, hosted by Tetris Kelly and Tiffany Taylor prior to the start of the show. The rest were revealed during the live television broadcast. Rodrigo won seven awards and was the most-awarded artist at the show. Drake garnered five awards, including Top Artist, taking his total wins to 34 overall and extending his record as the most-decorated artist in BBMA history. BTS won the most awards of any duo or group at the show, winning three of their seven nominations, including their third Top Duo/Group award which tied them with One Direction for the most wins in that category. They also became the most-awarded group in BBMA history—12 wins overall—breaking a 17-year record previously held by Destiny's Child with 11 wins. Bieber won his second award for Top Hot 100 Song, with "Stay", and became the only artist to win the award twice since it was first presented in 1990. Blige was honored with the 10th Billboard Icon Award, while youth activist Mari Copeny (Little Miss Flint) received the third Change Maker Award in honor of her environmental advocacy efforts for Flint, Michigan.

Winners are listed first and highlighted in bold.

References 

2022 in Nevada
2022 awards in the United States
2022 in American music
2022 music awards
Billboard awards
Billboard Music Award
May 2022 events in the United States
MGM Grand Garden Arena